List of governors of the Mexican state of Sinaloa:

External links
List of governors of Sinaloa. 

Sinaloa